The SsangYong Kyron is a mid-size SUV built by the SsangYong Motor Company. It had a Mercedes-Benz diesel engine and was designed by Ken Greenley. It received a facelift in 2007. The name of the car is an inaccurate portmanteau made combining the pronounced sound of the mathematical symbol chi and the word run, which is intended to mean "infinite run."

Engines 
The XDi270 diesel engine is available on the Kyron increasing the performance to /. Both the XDi200 and XDi270 uses the 3rd-generation Common Rail technology. The direct injection system slightly boosts the power and fuel efficiency. The new third generation ECU is operating on 32-bit platform rather than the 16-bit found on the previous 2 generations of common-rail technology. There is also 3.2 MPI engine available reaching up to 162 kW - 220 hp. The transmission on all models is Mercedes Benz 5G-Tronic model W722-6 5 speed.

A hybrid model was also due to be released using the same system as the C200 Eco.

Motorsport 
In the 2009 Dakar Rally, Isidre Esteve Pujol and team mate Eric Auge Medina came 71st in a Kyron 2.7DCI.

Gallery

References

External links 

 Official SsangYong Kyron website

Kyron
Cars introduced in 2005
Mid-size sport utility vehicles
2010s cars